An aphid is a type of sap-feeding insect. 

Aphid may also refer to: 
Molniya R-60 or Aphid, a Soviet/Russian air-to-air missile
Lake Storm "Aphid", a 2006 snowstorm in Buffalo, New York